Tay Gowan (born January 7, 1998) is an American football cornerback for the Minnesota Vikings of the National Football League (NFL). He played college football at UCF and was drafted by the Arizona Cardinals in the sixth round of the 2021 NFL Draft.

Early life and high school
Gowan grew up in Covington, Georgia and attended Newton High School. As a high school senior, he earned First-team All-State honors as a defensive back after posting four interceptions and 15 pass breakups.

College career
Gowan began his collegiate career at Miami University, where he redshirted as a true freshman and saw little playing time the following season. He left the program after his redshirt freshman season and enrolled at Butler Community College. In his lone season at Butler, he intercepted six passes and was named All-Jayhawk Conference. Gowan committed to transfer to the University of Central Florida.

Gowan began his first season with the Knights as a reserve defensive back, but became a starter due to injuries. He finished the season with 31 tackles, two interceptions, eight passes broken up and one fumble recovery while allowing 20 catches on 50 passes thrown into his coverage. Gowan opted out of the 2020 season due to the COVID-19 pandemic and declared early for the 2021 NFL Draft.

Professional career

Arizona Cardinals
Gowan was drafted by the Arizona Cardinals in the sixth round, 223rd overall, of the 2021 NFL Draft. Gowan signed his four-year rookie contract with Arizona on May 25, 2021.

Philadelphia Eagles
Gowan was traded along with a fifth round pick in the 2022 NFL Draft to the Philadelphia Eagles in exchange for tight end Zach Ertz on October 15, 2021. He was waived on August 30, 2022.

Minnesota Vikings
Gowan signed with the Vikings practice squad on September 1, 2022. Gowan was elevated to active roster from the practice squad on November 19, 2022. He signed a reserve/future contract on January 16, 2023.

References

External links
UCF Knights bio
Minnesota Vikings bio

1998 births
Living people
Arizona Cardinals players
Philadelphia Eagles players
Players of American football from Georgia (U.S. state)
Sportspeople from the Atlanta metropolitan area
American football cornerbacks
UCF Knights football players
Butler Grizzlies football players
Miami RedHawks football players
People from Covington, Georgia
Minnesota Vikings players